Rolling Caravans is a 1938 American Western film directed by Joseph Levering and written by Nate Gatzert. The film stars Jack Luden, Eleanor Stewart, Harry Woods, Lafe McKee, Buzz Barton and Slim Whitaker. The film was released on March 7, 1938, by Columbia Pictures.

Plot

Cast          
Jack Luden as Breezy 
Eleanor Stewart as Alice Rankin
Harry Woods as Thad Dalton
Lafe McKee as Henry Rankin
Buzz Barton as Jim Rankin
Slim Whitaker as Boots
Bud Osborne as Groucher 
Cactus Mack as Happy
Tuffy as Tuffy

References

External links
 

1938 films
American Western (genre) films
1938 Western (genre) films
Columbia Pictures films
American black-and-white films
Films directed by Joseph Levering
1930s English-language films
1930s American films